Centroctena imitans is a moth of the family Sphingidae. It is known from wooded areas of eastern Africa, from Mozambique to eastern Kenya.

The length of the forewings is 29–31 mm. It is very similar to Centroctena rutherfordi, but the crenulations of the forewing termen are deeper and irregular, the black spots at the base of the abdomen are lacking, the ground colour is very dark sepia to creamy, lacking all traces of yellow and green and the oblique creamy band of the forewing has straight margins throughout its length and is not undulate in the distal half.

References

Macroglossini
Moths described in 1882
Moths of Africa